Khenemetneferhedjet II (Weret) was an ancient Egyptian queen of the 12th Dynasty, a wife of Senusret III.

She was one of four known wives of Senusret III, the other three were Meretseger, Neferhenut and (possibly) Sithathoriunet. Her name was also a queen's title used in the era: khenemetneferhedjet means “united with the white crown”. She is mentioned on two of her husband's statues (now located in the British Museum and in the Egyptian Museum, respectively; the latter was found in Herakleopolis). She was buried in Pyramid IX in the Dahshur pyramid complex, where her jewellery was found in 1994.

Her titles were: King's Wife and Great of Sceptre.

Sources

19th-century BC women
Queens consort of the Twelfth Dynasty of Egypt
Senusret III